Ricardo Moreno Bastida (born 2 June 1969) is a Mexican politician from the Party of the Democratic Revolution. From 2000 to 2003 he served as Deputy of the LVIII Legislature of the Mexican Congress representing the State of Mexico.

References

1969 births
Living people
Politicians from the State of Mexico
Party of the Democratic Revolution politicians
21st-century Mexican politicians
Autonomous University of Mexico State alumni
Deputies of the LVIII Legislature of Mexico
Members of the Chamber of Deputies (Mexico) for the State of Mexico